The solar cycle is a 28-year cycle of the Julian calendar, and 400-year cycle of the Gregorian calendar with respect to the week. It occurs because leap years occur every 4 years, typically observed by adding a day to the month of February, making it February 29th. There are 7 possible days to start a leap year, making a 28-year sequence.

This cycle also occurs in the Gregorian calendar, but it is interrupted by years such as 1800, 1900, 2100, 2200, 2300 and 2500, which are divisible by four but which are common years. This interruption has the effect of skipping 16 years of the solar cycle between February 28 and March 1. Because the Gregorian cycle of 400 years has exactly 146,097 days, i.e. exactly 20,871 weeks, one can say that the Gregorian so-called solar cycle lasts 400 years.

Calendar years are usually marked by Dominical letters indicating the first Sunday in a new year, thus the term solar cycle can also refer to a repeating sequence of Dominical letters. Unless a year is not a leap year due to Gregorian exceptions, a sequence of calendars is reused every 28 years.

Sun-based calendars are first thought to be used by the Egyptians, who based it around the annual sunrise of the Dog Star and flooding of the Nile River.

See also
 Birkat Hachama
 Dominical letter
 Doomsday rule
 Friday the 13th
 Lunar Calendar

References

Further reading
 C. R. Cheney (rev. Michael Jones), 2012: Handbook of dates (2nd edition), CUP

External links  
 The ISO 8601 calendar using week numbers, explained using Dominical letters. 

Calendars
Gregorian calendar
Julian calendar
Units of time